Libor Pimek and Blaine Willenborg were the defending champions, but did not participate this year.

Tore Meinecke and Ricki Osterthun won in the final 6–2, 3–6, 6–2, against Jaroslav Navrátil and Tom Nijssen.

Seeds

Draw

Draw

References
Draw

ATP Athens Open
1987 Grand Prix (tennis)